Gis (also Romanized as Gīs; also known as Gīseh, Gīshū’īyeh-ye Bāla, Gīshū’īyeh-ye Pā’īn, and Kīsa) is a village in Dar Agah Rural District, in the Central District of Hajjiabad County, Hormozgan Province, Iran. At the 2006 census, its population was 721, in 170 families.

References 

Populated places in Hajjiabad County